Gutterballs is a 2008 Canadian rape-and-revenge slasher comedy splatter film written and directed by Ryan Nicholson.

Plot 
On January 1, 2008, at the Xcalibur Bowling Centre, a disco-themed bowling alley in Surrey, British Columbia, Egerton, the janitor, has allowed two groups of teenagers to bowl against one another after hours. The "prep", Steve, is still bitter after his best friend Jamie, the "jock", had sex with Lisa, a girl with whom Steve was smitten and even took to their senior prom. After Steve and his friends Joey, Patrick, and A.J. harass the "tranny", Sam, they are chastised by Jamie. This leads to a brawl between Steve's team and Jamie's. Lisa breaks up the fight by dropping a bowling ball on Steve's foot just as Steve is about to kick Jamie again. Egerton, brandishing a shotgun, tells the teenagers to leave and they can continue their tournament the following night.

Having forgotten her purse in the arcade, Lisa returns to find Steve and his friends waiting for her. Steve proceeds to violently rape Lisa while the others watch. Egerton is oblivious to Lisa's cries for help as he is downstairs cleaning up the teenagers' mess. After he finishes raping Lisa, Steve leaves the room. While Steve is gone, A.J. anally rapes Lisa on the pool table; then it's Joey who abuses her. Patrick, who believed the three were only going to "scare" Lisa, refuses to participate. Steve returns with a bowling pin and prepares to insert it into Lisa before Patrick intervenes. Steve retorts by giving Patrick the pin and ordering him to do it himself. Patrick refuses at first but complies when Steve threatens to do the same to him. The four leave Lisa on the pool table, naked and barely conscious.

The following night, the two groups arrive at the bowling alley to continue their tournament. Steve is joined by his "girlfriends", Julia and Hannah. Jamie arrives late with Lisa, who barely speaks. As the teams begin their first game, Lisa suddenly gets on an elevator. She is confronted by Patrick, who says he's only there to apologize. Lisa believes that he wants to make sure that she hasn't contacted the police. During the game, the players notice a mystery player on the scoreboard, BBK, but believe it is just a glitch. One of Jamie's friends, Dave, meets Julia in the bar and pays for the two beers she ordered. When he discovers that one of them belongs to Steve, he asks if he can urinate in it. Julia tells him that she doesn't care and that she dislikes Steve too but hangs out with him anyway because he's dating her friend Hannah. Julia follows Dave into the bathroom, and the two begin to make out. A mysterious person wearing bowling attire exits one of the stalls while Dave and Julia are in the 69 position and forces each one further onto the other, suffocating them both. After this, two strikes appear next to BBK on the scoreboard in the form of a skull and crossbones.

The game continues, and Sam goes to the bathroom to "freshen up." The person who murdered Dave and Julia is hiding in one of the stalls, and Sam, frightened by the noise coming from the stall, approaches it and is pulled inside. She tries to bargain with the killer, but the killer murders her by forcing a bowling pin down her throat. The killer lifts Sam's skirt up and, using the switchblade Sam tried to defend herself with, castrates Sam lengthwise. Lisa rejoins the group. Later, Ben and Cindy leave to have sex in a storage room upstairs, but Ben goes to buy a condom from the vending machine in the bathroom. Joey goes back behind the pinsetters to fix his team's after noticing they were broken. Ben dies in the bathroom when the killer hits him over the head with a bowling pin and gouges his eyes out with a sharpened one. A.J. notices the strikes appearing next to BBK on the scoreboard and questions Egerton about it, who assures him that it is still a glitch. Egerton sends A.J. to an area currently being remodeled with an "out of order" sign to put on an automatic ball polisher that Joey broke earlier. The killer finds Cindy upstairs and strangles her to death with a pair of bowling sneakers. Downstairs, Hannah searches for Julia but dies when the killer crushes her head with two bowling balls. A.J. turns the ball polisher on and finds it already fixed but gets killed when the killer uses it to wax his face off.

Noticing something amiss, Steve leaves to find Joey behind the pinsetters, headless. Steve is frightened by the killer, who bludgeons him with a bowling pin before sodomizing him with another sharpened pin. Steve drops to the floor, and the killer smashes his head in with the bowling pin. Meanwhile, Sarah and Jamie continue their game. Jamie reaches into the ball return slot to find his bowling ball, instead discovering Joey's severed head. The two try desperately to escape the bowling alley before coming face to face with the killer. They run and hide in the basement, where they find their friends' bodies. The killer appears with a shotgun and removes the bowling bag to reveal Egerton's face. Sarah discovers that Jamie knew about the murders of Steve, Joey, and A.J. but not the others. Lisa appears, dressed up as well, revealing that she murdered Steve. Jamie explains that Lisa told her father, who turns out to be Egerton, about the rape, and Egerton let Jamie in on the plan. When Lisa asked why he killed her friends, too, Egerton explains that they didn't help Lisa and were, therefore, just as guilty. Lisa tells him that they were not there and did not know. Another killer (possibly the real "BBK") enters the basement and removes the bowling bag to reveal Patrick's face. Patrick explains that he confessed his involvement to Egerton and wanted to contact the police, but Egerton let him in on the plan instead, and he was the person who murdered Joey and A.J., supposedly to make it up to her. Lisa is furious that her father allowed him to live, so Egerton betrays Patrick and slits his throat with the switchblade he got from Sam. Jamie, realizing he's out of control, wrestles Egerton to the ground and, after a scuffle, blows his head clean off with the shotgun. Lisa cradles her father's body before grabbing the switchblade and trying to attack Jamie. Sarah grabs the shotgun and kills Lisa.

With the three "BBK"'s dead, Sarah shoots the locks off the emergency doors, and the two survivors escape the bowling alley. Traumatized and, above all, upset that Jamie did nothing to prevent the murders, Sarah turns the gun on him. The screen cuts to black as a gunshot is heard, indicating that Sarah murdered Jamie and is on the run.

Cast 
 Dan Ellis as Egerton
 Alastair Gamble as Steve
 Mihola Terzic as Sarah
 Nathan Witte as Jamie
 Candice Lewald as Lisa
 Trevor Gemma as Patrick
 Nathan Dashwood as A.J.
 Wade Gibb as Joey
 Jimmy Blais as Sam
 Jeremy Beland as Ben
 Scott Alonzo as Dave
 Danielle Munro as Julia
 Stephanie Schacter as Cindy
 Saraphina Bardeaux as Hannah

Release 
The Balls-Out Uncut Edition was released by Plotdigger Films on DVD on April 29, 2008. The film was re-released (with an altered soundtrack) by TLA Releasing the following year on January 27, 2009.

The Pin-Etration Edition, a cut containing hardcore inserts and limited to 69 copies, was available for purchase on the Plotdigger Films website in 2011.

The film has a total of 516 uses of the word "fuck", ranking it fourth (behind Swearnet: The Movie, the documentary of the same name about the history and usage of the word, and The Wolf of Wall Street)) and first in total usage for a scripted motion picture.

Nicholson submitted the film to the MPAA Rating Board. The film, however, was released unrated when he was told that almost twenty minutes would have to be cut to avoid an NC-17 rating.

Reception 
Johnny Butane of Dread Central said that while the music was fitting and the gore was impressive, the film suffered from atrociously bad acting, and "hits all the wrong notes, even if it's intentions are in the right place".

In a review for DVD Verdict, Gordon Sullivan praised the gore, the atmosphere, and the performance of Dan Ellis, and despite finding various faults with the film (such as the prolonged rape scene, actions of the killers, and discomforting nudity) still recommended it, finding that it "delivers on everything it promises: old-school slasher thrills loaded with gore and nudity set in a kitschy '80s bowling alley". Gutterballs was described as "one of the weirdest movies I've seen" by Kurt Dahlke of DVD Talk, who gave it a two and a half out of a possible five, and concluded that it was "a damn fine sexually explicit, graphically violent, morally repugnant, willfully bad B movie" that refreshingly took itself seriously, despite the over-the-top subject matter.

Sequel 
A sequel, subtitled Balls Deep, premiered in 2015, written and directed by Ryan Nicholson. The film stars Aidan Dee, Momona Komagata and Kirsty Elizabeth in the leading roles. The film premiered in May 2015 as part of the Texas Frightmare Weekend.

References

External links 
 
 

2008 films
2008 horror films
2008 LGBT-related films
2000s slasher films
Canadian LGBT-related films
English-language Canadian films
2000s English-language films
Films directed by Ryan Nicholson
Ten-pin bowling films
Films set in Vancouver
Films shot in Vancouver
Canadian independent films
LGBT-related horror films
Rape and revenge films
Canadian slasher films
Canadian splatter films
Transgender-related films
Canadian films about revenge
Canadian vigilante films
Canadian comedy horror films
2000s exploitation films
2000s Canadian films
2000s vigilante films